Kamil Amadu Conteh (born 26 December 2002) is a professional footballer currently playing as a midfielder for Gateshead on loan from Middlesbrough. Born in England, he represents the Sierra Leone national team.

Club career

Watford
Conteh joined Watford in 2018, signing his first professional deal in July 2021. He went onto make his first-team debut in January 2022, featuring for 16 minutes during a 4–1 defeat to Leicester City in the third round of the FA Cup.

On 5 February 2022, Conteh joined National League South side Braintree Town on loan from Watford for the remainder of the 2021–22 season. On that same day, he made his debut during a 0–0 draw with Eastbourne Borough, featuring for 87 minutes before being replaced by Michael Dome-Benwin. Just two weeks later, Conteh scored his first goal for the club, giving the Essex-based side a 1–0 home victory over Hungerford Town in the 61st minute.

Middlesbrough
In April 2022, with his contract coming to a close at Watford, Conteh spent time on trial with Championship side, Middlesbrough. Subsequently signing a contract with them in May 2022.

On 1 October 2022, Conteh signed for National League club Gateshead on loan until 2 January 2023. This loan was later extended until the end of the season having featured fifteen times, scoring twice.

International career
On 17 March 2022, Conteh received a maiden call-up to the Sierra Leone squad for their friendlies against Togo, Liberia and Congo. A week later, Conteh received his first cap during their 3–0 defeat to Togo, playing the full 90 minutes.

Career statistics

Club
.

International

References

2002 births
Living people
Footballers from Greater London
Sierra Leonean footballers
Sierra Leone international footballers
English footballers
English sportspeople of Sierra Leonean descent
Association football midfielders
Watford F.C. players
Braintree Town F.C. players
Middlesbrough F.C. players
Gateshead F.C. players
National League (English football) players